Skint is a British documentary series broadcast from 13 May 2013 to 27 April 2015 on Channel 4. It followed members of the general public in various locations who are either unemployed or have very little income as they live their daily lives. The series features many issues in episodes including alcoholism, drugs misuse, long term unemployment and legal matters.

Episodes
All episode ratings are taken from the Broadcasters' Audience Research Board website.

Series One (2013)
Series One was set in Scunthorpe.

Series Two (2014)
Series Two was set in Grimsby.

Series Three (2015)
Series Three was set in Merthyr Tydfil.

References

External links
 Skint at Channel4.com

2013 British television series debuts
2015 British television series endings
Channel 4 documentaries
English-language television shows
Television shows set in Lincolnshire
Television shows set in Wales